Charleston High School is a public high school in Charleston, Illinois, United States.

History
It is among the few public high schools in Illinois to receive a distinguished GreatSchools Rating of 8 out of 10. Charleston High School serves grades 9–12 in the Charleston CUSD 1 district. The AP® participation rate at Charleston High School is 12 percent. The student body makeup is 51 percent male and 49 percent female, and the total minority enrollment is 6 percent. The total enrollment from the year 2011 was 809. There are also 50 full-time teachers on the staff of Charleston High School. The student teacher ratio is 16:1. They are rated from 0 (worst) to 100 (best) at 84. They did not meet the education standards for 2011. Charleston High School offers AP courses in nine subjects. They meet the immunization protection levels required by the state. 61.3% of students met PSAE standards in the year 2011. Charleston High School follows Illinois and Charleston CUSD 1 District guidelines. The community rating for this school is four out of five stars. This is the reported crime rate since 2006 - 0 for Assault/Battery, 1 for Weapons, and 10 for Drugs. At Charleston High School in Spring 2010, 33.7% of juniors scored high enough on at least three of the four parts of the ACT to be considered “college-ready” for key freshman classes.

Athletics
Charleston's High School athletics participate in the Apollo Conference and are members of the Illinois High School Association.

Boys
Baseball
Basketball
Cross Country
Football
Golf
Soccer
Swimming & Diving
Tennis
Track & Field
Wrestling

Girls
Basketball
Cross Country
Cheerleading
Dance
Golf
Softball
Soccer
Swimming & Diving 
Tennis
Track & Field
Volleyball

Notable team state finishes
Boys Golf: 2017-18 & 2018-19 (1st)
Drama: 1990-91 (2nd), 1993-94 & 2002-03 & 2004-05 (3rd)
Girls Golf: 2015-16 (3rd), 2016-17 (1st)
Group Interpretation: 2001-02 (2nd)

Extracurricular activities
American Field Service
C Club
High School Press
Chess Club
FCCLA
Flag Corps
Freedom Writers Club
French Club
French National Honor Day Society
Future Business Leaders of America
FFA
Interact Club
National Honor Society
Performing Music Ensembles
Recorder Club
Scholastic Bowl
Spanish Club
Spanish National Honor Society 
Speech and Drama Team
Student Council
Trojan News
Visual Art Club

Notable alumni
 Marty Pattin, former Major League Baseball pitcher (California Angels, Seattle Pilots, Milwaukee Brewers, Boston Red Sox, Kansas City Royals)
 Jeff Gossett, former NFL punter (Los Angeles/Oakland Raiders)
 Ray Fisher, former NFL player  
 Rex Morgan, former NBA player
 Stan Royer, former MLB player (St. Louis Cardinals, Boston Red Sox)

References

External links
 

Public high schools in Illinois
Schools in Coles County, Illinois